No Place to Run is a 1972 American made-for-television drama film directed by Delbert Mann and starring Herschel Bernardi, Stefanie Powers and Larry Hagman.

Plot
An adopted boy's parents are killed, and to keep him from returning to the state's custody, he and his grandfather run away.

Cast
 Herschel Bernardi as Hyam Malsh
 Stefanie Powers as Bonnie Howard
 Larry Hagman as Jay Fox
 Neville Brand as Remis
 Tom Bosley as Dr Sam Golinski
 Scott Jacoby as Doug
 Kay Medford as Landlady
 Robert Donner as Car salesman
 Wesley Lau as Bill Ryan
 Woodrow Parfrey as Motel manager 
 Will J. White as Highway Patrolman
 Curt Conway as Old man #1
 Peter Brocco as Old man #2
 Larry Watson as Cabbie
 Frank White as Construction worker
 Wesley E. Barry II as Young helper

See also
 List of American films of 1972

References

External links

1972 television films
1972 films
Films directed by Delbert Mann